Annanhill is an area of the town of Kilmarnock, in East Ayrshire. It is the home of Annanhill Primary, Grange Academy and Park School.

References

Ayrshire